Boston Township is a civil township of Ionia County in the U.S. state of Michigan.  As of the 2000 census, the township population was 4,961.

Communities
Saranac is a village in the northeast corner of the township.

Geography

Demographics
As of the census of 2000, there were 4,961 people, 1,881 households, and 1,356 families residing in the township. The racial makeup of the township was 97.72% White, 0.24% African American, 0.28% Native American, 0.20% Asian, 0.06% Pacific Islander, 0.52% from other races, and 0.97% from two or more races. Hispanic or Latino of any race were 1.94% of the population.

There were 1,881 households, out of which 35.4% had children under the age of 18 living with them, 60.2% were married couples living together, 8.1% had a female householder with no husband present, and 27.9% were non-families. 23.5% of all households were made up of individuals, and 10.2% had someone living alone who was 65 years of age or older.  The average household size was 2.61 and the average family size was 3.09.

In the township the population was spread out, with 27.6% under the age of 18, 7.4% from 18 to 24, 30.3% from 25 to 44, 23.0% from 45 to 64, and 11.6% who were 65 years of age or older.  The median age was 36 years. For every 100 females, there were 97.9 males.  For every 100 females age 18 and over, there were 93.8 males.

The median income for a household in the township was $43,172, and the median income for a family was $48,297. Males had a median income of $38,545 versus $25,000 for females. The per capita income for the township was $18,836.  About 3.9% of families and 6.7% of the population were below the poverty line, including 6.3% of those under age 18 and 11.9% of those age 65 or over.

References

Townships in Ionia County, Michigan
Grand Rapids metropolitan area
Townships in Michigan